Churchhouse may refer to:

 Robert Churchhouse (1927–2018), English academic
 South Fulton Churchhouse

See also
 Church house